Robert Edward Gunderman (born October 9, 1934) is a former American football end who played college football for University of Virginia and professional football in the National Football League (NFL) for the Pittsburgh Steelers in 1957. He appeared in four NFL games.

Early years
Gunderman was born in 1934 in Sparta, New Jersey, and attended Franklin High School in New Jersey.

Virginia
Gunderman played college football at University of Virginia from 1953 to 1956. He played on both offense and defense at Virginia and developed a reputation as "a scrapper", "a special weapon", and a player with "a zest for contact." On offense, he was a key blocker for Virginia's All-American blocker Jim Bakhtiar.

Professional football
He was drafted by the Detroit Lions in the 19th round (227th overall pick) of the 1957 NFL Draft. The Lions traded him to the Pittsburgh Steelers in August 1957 in exchange for a draft choice. He spent the 1957 season with the Pittsburgh Steelers, appearing in four games. He signed with the Winnipeg Blue Bombers in April 1959, but he was injured in a car crash in June 1959, then cut by the club in August. He played in 1960 with the Franklin Miners of the Eastern Football Conference, in 1961 with the Akron Pros of the United Football League, in 1962 with the Paterson Miners of the Atlantic Coast Football League.

References

1934 births
Living people
American football ends
Pittsburgh Steelers players
Virginia Cavaliers football players
Players of American football from New Jersey
People from Sparta, New Jersey
Sportspeople from Sussex County, New Jersey